is a railway station on the Kintetsu Minami Osaka Line in Higashisumiyoshi-ku, Osaka, Osaka Prefecture, Japan.

Layout
There are 2 side platforms with 4 tracks elevated.  Numbers 2 and 3 are used for passing trains.

Adjacent stations

Higashisumiyoshi-ku, Osaka
Railway stations in Japan opened in 1931
Railway stations in Osaka